The 1921 Penistone by-election was a by-election held on 5 March 1921 for the British House of Commons constituency of Penistone in Yorkshire.

Vacancy
The seat had become vacant on the resignation of the Liberal Member of Parliament Sydney Arnold, due to ill-health. He had held the seat since its creation for the 1918 general election.

Electoral history
The result at the last General Election in 1918 was;

Candidates
Upon the announcement of the resignation of Arnold, the local Liberals immediately adopted 47-year-old William Pringle as their candidate to defend the seat. Pringle was the member for Lanarkshire North West from January 1910 to 1918. In 1918 his Lanarkshire seat was abolished and he unsuccessfully contested Glasgow Springburn. He unsuccessfully sought a return to parliament at the 1919 Manchester Rusholme by-election. 
The Coalition government candidate was the Liberal, Sir James Peace Hinchcliffe who had the official support of the local Unionists.
The Labour Party selected Alderman William Gillis as their candidate to challenge for the seat.

Campaign
Polling Day was set for 5 March, making it the fourth by-election to be held that week. On 25 February nominations closed to confirm that the election would be a three-way contest.

Sir James Hinchcliffe received the official endorsement of the Coalition Government.

Result
The result was a gain for the Labour Party.

Aftermath
Pringle reversed the tables on Gillis at the following General Election when the Liberals re-gained the seat from the Labour party;

See also
United Kingdom by-election records
Penistone constituency
1959 Penistone by-election
Penistone
List of United Kingdom by-elections (1918–1931)

References

1921 elections in the United Kingdom
By-elections to the Parliament of the United Kingdom in South Yorkshire constituencies
Elections in Barnsley
1921 in England
Politics of Penistone
1920s in Yorkshire